The Samuel Foster House (also known as the Foster-Emerson House) is a historic house in Reading, Massachusetts.

Samuel Foster, an early miller and farmer built the house in 1709 and his family resided in the building until Ebenezer Emerson purchased the house from the Fosters in 1769. Emerson served in the American Revolutionary War. The Meadow Brook Golf Club acquired the house and barn in 1912, and groundskeepers lived in the house from 1923 to the 1980s. The house was added to the National Register of Historic Places in 1990. In 1998 the house was moved from the golf course at 288 Grove Street to 409 Grove Street when it was no longer needed by the club, and there was a citywide effort to preserve the building from demolition.

See also
National Register of Historic Places listings in Reading, Massachusetts
National Register of Historic Places listings in Middlesex County, Massachusetts

References

External links
Official Website
House information

Houses on the National Register of Historic Places in Reading, Massachusetts
Houses in Reading, Massachusetts